Acrotaeniostola quinaria is a species of tephritid or fruit flies in the genus Acrotaeniostola of the family Tephritidae.

Distribution
Hong Kong.

References

Tephritinae
Insects described in 1910
Diptera of Asia